Álvaro of Córdoba (c.1350–c.1430) was born at Zamora in Spain and entered the Order of Preachers in 1368. He preached throughout Spain and Italy and also established the priory of Scala Caeli at Córdoba where he promoted the regular life. By his preaching and contemplation of the Lord's Passion he spread the practice of the Way of the Cross throughout the West. He died on 19 February 1430. Pope Benedict XIV beatified him in 1741.

References

Lives of the Saints: For Every Day of the Year edited by Rev. Hugo Hoever, S.O.Cist., Ph.D. New York: Catholic Book Publishing Co., (1948)

External links
Calendar of the Order of Preachers
Catholic Online

15th-century Christian saints
15th-century venerated Christians
1350 births
1430 deaths
Spanish Roman Catholic saints
Spanish Dominicans
People from Córdoba, Spain
Beatifications by Pope Benedict XIV
Venerated Catholics